Bodybuilding was an event which took place at the 2006 Asian Games in Doha, Qatar on December 8 and 9. The competition included only men's events for eight different weight categories. All events were held at the Al-Dana Banquet Hall. Qatar finished first in the medal table by winning two goals.

Schedule

Medalists

Medal table

Participating nations
A total of 94 athletes from 25 nations competed in bodybuilding at the 2006 Asian Games:

References

External links

 
2006
2006 Asian Games events
Bodybuilding competitions in Qatar
Asian Games